Suresh Ganouri (born 6 January 1957) is a Guyanese cricketer. He played in ten first-class and two List A matches for Guyana from 1976 to 1984.

See also
 List of Guyanese representative cricketers

References

External links
 

1957 births
Living people
Guyanese cricketers
Guyana cricketers